Allikukivi is a village in Saarde Parish, Pärnu County in Estonia.

References

Villages in Pärnu County